Dropline is a commercial fishing device.

Dropline may also refer to:

 Dropline GNOME, software

See also
 
 
 Drip line (disambiguation)